Raquel Kops-Jones and Abigail Spears were the defending champions, but Spears chose not to participate this year. Kops-Jones played alongside Anastasia Rodionova, but lost in the second round to Chuang Chia-jung and Hsieh Su-wei.
Chan Hao-ching and Chan Yung-jan won the title, defeating Casey Dellacqua and Yaroslava Shvedova in the final, 7–5, 6–4.

Seeds
The top four seeds received a bye into the second round.

Draw

Finals

Top half

Bottom half

External links
 Main draw

Women's Doubles